Kissaviarsuk-33 is a sports club from Greenland based in Qaqortoq. They compete in football, badminton and handball. Formed in 1933, they are the oldest sports club still playing football in Greenland.

Achievements 
Greenlandic Football Championship: 8
Champion : 1964, 1967, 1969, 1987, 1988, 1991, 1998, 2003

External links 
 Greenland Football Association Official website
 The Remotest Football website

Football clubs in Greenland
Association football clubs established in 1933
Qaqortoq
1933 establishments in Greenland
Handball clubs in Greenland